John Hammond Teacher (1869 - November 21, 1930) was St Mungo (Notman) professor of pathology at Glasgow Royal Infirmary. He wrote The Manual of Pathology and created a pathology museum.

Teacher was born in Old Kilpatrick in 1869. He received his education at Glasgow Academy and at the University of Glasgow.

Selected publications
 On the History of Pathology in the Glasgow Royal Infirmary and the Functions of the Pathological Department, Glasgow Royal Infirmary. Pathology Dept. (1912).

References

1869 births
1930 deaths
Scottish pathologists